The Waimanalo Formation is a geologic formation in Hawaii. It preserves fossils dating back to the Neogene period.

See also

 List of fossiliferous stratigraphic units in Hawaii
 Paleontology in Hawaii

References
 

Neogene Hawaii